Dennis Mochan (born 12 December 1935) is a Scottish former professional footballer. He played as a fullback for Kilsyth Rangers before playing for Scottish Football League clubs East Fife and Raith Rovers. He then moved to English football, playing for Nottingham Forest and Colchester United, before retiring. Mochan then became a member of the coaching staff at Colchester. Following Dick Graham's resignation as Colchester manager in 1972, Mochan acted as caretaker manager for 5 games, drawing two and losing three.

Managerial statistics

References

External links
 Dennis Mochan at Colchester United Archive Database
 

1935 births
Living people
Kilsyth Rangers F.C. players
East Fife F.C. players
Raith Rovers F.C. players
Nottingham Forest F.C. players
Colchester United F.C. players
Colchester United F.C. managers
Scottish footballers
Footballers from Falkirk
Scottish Football League players
English Football League players
Association football fullbacks
Scottish football managers